Most shooting ranges in Norway are available to the public through membership in shooting clubs. There are over 3000 shooting ranges in Norway, where over 1000 of them are currently in use.

List of shooting ranges in Norway 
Below is a list over shooting ranges per county municipality for bow, crossbow, shotgun, pistol and rifle.

Akershus
Aust-Agder (Norwegian Wikipedia)
Buskerud (Norwegian Wikipedia)
Hedmark (Norwegian Wikipedia)
Finnmark (Norwegian Wikipedia)
Hordaland (Norwegian Wikipedia)
Møre og Romsdal (Norwegian Wikipedia)
Nord-Trøndelag (Norwegian Wikipedia)
Nordland (Norwegian Wikipedia)
Oppland (Norwegian Wikipedia)
Oslo (Norwegian Wikipedia)
Rogaland (Norwegian Wikipedia)
Sogn og Fjordane (Norwegian Wikipedia)
Sør-Trøndelag (Norwegian Wikipedia)
Telemark (Norwegian Wikipedia)
Troms (Norwegian Wikipedia)
Vest-Agder (Norwegian Wikipedia)
Vestfold (Norwegian Wikipedia)
Østfold (Norwegian Wikipedia)
Svalbard and Jan Mayen (Norwegian Wikipedia)

See also 
Shooting sport
Shooting ranges in the United States
Shooting ranges in Switzerland

References

External links 
 Map showing shooting ranges affiliated with National Rifle Association of Norway
 Map showing shooting ranges affiliated with  Dynamic Sports Shooting Norway
 Map showing shooting ranges affiliated with Norwegian Association of Hunters and Anglers
 The book "Skytebane-guiden" (The Shooting Range Guide) by Svend Åge Sæther and Øystein Antonsen, 1997, Sæther & Antonsen, .

Shooting ranges
Sports venues in Norway
Society of Norway
Lists of sports venues in Norway
Sport shooting-related lists